The 1801 Connecticut gubernatorial election took place on April 9, 1801. Incumbent Federalist Governor Jonathan Trumbull Jr. won re-election to a fourth full term, defeating Democratic-Republican candidate Richard Law.

Results

References 

Gubernatorial
Connecticut
1801